was a city located in Akita Prefecture, Japan.

In 2003, the city had an estimated population of 39,048 and a density of 372.99 persons per km2. The total area was 104.69 km2.

On March 22, 2005, Ōmagari, along with the towns of Kamioka, Kyōwa, Nakasen, Nishisenboku, Ōta and Semboku; and the village of Nangai (all from Semboku District), merged to create the city of Daisen.

Baseball pitcher Juei Ushiromatsu was born in Ōmagari.

The city was founded on May 3, 1954.

Associated fictional characters 
Hiroshi Nohara was born and raised in Omagari, moved to Kasukabe.

See also
Kakumagawa, Akita

External links 
 Daisen official website 

Dissolved municipalities of Akita Prefecture
Daisen, Akita